Sex and Lies in Sin City: The Ted Binion Scandal is a 2008 Lifetime Television film starring Johnathon Schaech, Marcia Gay Harden, Matthew Modine, and Mena Suvari.

Premise
The film details the events surrounding the death of Las Vegas casino owner Ted Binion. It follows the ensuing investigation of Binion's life and the people in it, such as Binion's sister Becky, his girlfriend Sandy Murphy, and Sandy's lover Rick Tabish.

Cast
 Matthew Modine as Ted Binion
 Mena Suvari as Sandy Murphy
 Marcia Gay Harden as Becky Binion
 Johnathon Schaech as Rick Tabish
 Chris Ashworth as Frank Lipjanic
 Peter Haskell as Ian Miller

References

External links 
 

Lifetime (TV network) films
2008 television films
2008 films
2000s crime films
Films directed by Peter Medak
2000s English-language films